Vladimír Kukoľ (born 8 May 1986) is a Slovak professional footballer who plays as a midfielder for Železiarne Podbrezová in the Fortuna Liga.

Career

Club
In June 2011, he joined Jagiellonia Białystok on a one-year contract.

References

External links
  

1986 births
Living people
Slovak footballers
FK Spišská Nová Ves players
MŠK Spišské Podhradie players
MFK Ružomberok players
Sandecja Nowy Sącz players
Jagiellonia Białystok players
Zawisza Bydgoszcz players
Spartak Myjava players
FC Vysočina Jihlava players
FK Poprad players
FK Železiarne Podbrezová players
Slovak Super Liga players
Czech First League players
Slovak expatriate footballers
Expatriate footballers in Poland
Expatriate footballers in the Czech Republic
Slovak expatriate sportspeople in Poland
Slovak expatriate sportspeople in the Czech Republic
Association football midfielders
2. Liga (Slovakia) players
People from Levoča
Sportspeople from the Prešov Region